The 2020 World Junior Ice Hockey Championship Division III consists of two groups of four teams each: the top 2 teams from each division played in the semifinals in a four-team bracket for a chance to play for promotion to Division II B, while the bottom 2 teams in each group played in placement rounds for 5th to 8th place. The Division III tournament was played in Sofia, Bulgaria, from 13 – 19 January 2020. Iceland won the tournament.

To be eligible as a junior player in these tournaments, a player couldn't be born earlier than 2000.

Participants

Match officials
Six referees and 10 linesmen were selected for the tournament.

Referees
 Anton Gofman
 Patrick Gruber
 Liu Jiaqi
 Levente Szilárd Sikó
 Sakari Suominen
 Kent Unwin

Linesmen
 Christoph Barnthaler
 Imre Fehér
 Gao Yinfeng
 Barna Kis-Király
 Artsiom Labzov
 Sæmundur Leifsson
 Stef Oosterling
 Kiril Peychinov
 Graham Rodger
 Vasiliy Vasilev

Preliminary round

All times are local (UTC+2).

Group A

Group B

Playoff round

5–8th Place Bracket

5–8th place semifinals

Seventh place game

Fifth place game

Finals Bracket

Semifinals

Bronze medal game

Gold medal game

Final ranking

Statistics

Top 10 scorers

GP = Games played; G = Goals; A = Assists; Pts = Points; +/− = Plus-minus; PIM = Penalties In Minutes
Source: IIHF

Goaltending leaders
(minimum 40% team's total ice time)

TOI = Time on ice (minutes:seconds); GA = Goals against; GAA = Goals against average; Sv% = Save percentage; SO = Shutouts
Source: IIHF.com

Awards

Best Players Selected by the Directorate

Source: IIHF

Best Players of Each Team Selected by Coaches

Source: IIHF

References

III
World Junior Ice Hockey Championships – Division III
International ice hockey competitions hosted by Bulgaria
2019–20 in Bulgarian ice hockey
Sports competitions in Sofia
IIHF